Weng Tonghe (1830–1904), courtesy name Shuping, was a Chinese Confucian scholar and imperial tutor who lived in the Qing dynasty. In 1856, he obtained the position of zhuangyuan (or top scholar) in the imperial examination and was subsequently admitted to the prestigious Hanlin Academy.

Weng's father, Weng Xincun, was an official who had been persecuted by an influential faction in the Qing imperial court led by Sushun. Weng Xincun was a tutor of Daoguang Emperor's sons, Yihui and Yihe. However, in 1861, a coup took place, bringing about the deposition of Sushun and his faction, and the new government, led by Prince Gong, Empress Dowager Ci'an and Empress Dowager Cixi, placed the senior Weng to high office.

In 1865, Weng was appointed as a tutor to the Tongzhi Emperor, joining another tutor by the name of Wo Ren, as well as a lecturer to the two empress dowagers. The Tongzhi Emperor formally took over the reins of power from his regents in 1873 but died two years later.

Weng had apparently been exonerated from the disastrous failure of the education of the Tongzhi Emperor, as he was appointed as a tutor to the Tongzhi Emperor's successor, the Guangxu Emperor. As a tutor to the Guangxu Emperor, Weng emphasized the boy-emperor's filial duties to Empress Dowager Cixi, making her an object of fear and reverence for him.

Along with his role as tutor, Weng accrued increased political power, occupying several important posts in the Qing administration, including Vice President and later President of the Board of Revenue, Director of the Censorate and President of the Board of Punishments. He also served on the Grand Council 1882–84 and participated in decisions made in the First Sino-Japanese War.

Weng was also known for being a patron of Kang Youwei, a man whom he began to dissociate with by the spring of 1898, and in light of this connection, it has been argued that Empress Dowager Cixi removed him from office. However, apparently it was the Guangxu Emperor himself who removed Weng from office in June 1898 after they got into a quarrel.

Weng is the great-great grandfather of Weng Wange 翁萬戈 (Wango Weng; 1918-2020), the well-known art historian, art collector, calligrapher, film maker and poet, who inherited many of the artistic masterpieces collected by Weng Tonghe, and who has donated many of them to major museums.

References

  Weng Tonghe (1830-1904) Calligraphy Gallery

External links
 

1830 births
1904 deaths
Artists from Suzhou
Chinese scholars
Politicians from Suzhou
Qing dynasty calligraphers
Qing dynasty politicians from Jiangsu
People from Changshu
Burials in Suzhou
Grand Councillors of the Qing dynasty
Assistant Grand Secretaries
Ministers of Zongli Yamen
Imperial tutors in Qing dynasty